Kwaya Kusar is a Local Government Area of Borno State, Nigeria. Its headquarters are in the town of Kwaya Kusar.

It has an area of 732 km and a population of 56,500 at the 2006 census.

The postal code of the area is 603.

The inhabitants speak the Bura language. They are mostly subsistence farmers.

It is one of the four LGAs that constitute the Biu Emirate, a traditional state located in Borno State, Nigeria.

References

Local Government Areas in Borno State
Populated places in Borno State